The Portico Library, The Portico or Portico Library and Gallery on Mosley Street, Manchester, is an independent subscription library designed in the Greek Revival style by Thomas Harrison of Chester and built between 1802 and 1806. It is recorded in the National Heritage List for England as a Grade II* listed building, having been designated on 25 February 1952, and has been described as "the most refined little building in Manchester".

The library was established as a result of a meeting of Manchester businessmen in 1802 which resolved to found an "institute uniting the advantages of a newsroom and a library". A visit by four of the men to the Athenaeum in Liverpool inspired them to achieve a similar institution in Manchester. Money was raised through 400 subscriptions from Manchester men and the library opened in 1806.

The library, mainly focused on 19th-century literature, was designed by Thomas Harrison, architect of Liverpool's Lyceum and built by one of the founders, David Bellhouse. Its first secretary, Peter Mark Roget, began his thesaurus here.

Today the ground floor is tenanted by The Bank, a public house that takes its name from the Bank of Athens that leased the property in 1921. The library occupies what became the first floor with its entrance on Charlotte Street.

Architecture

The library was the first Greek Revival building in the city. Its interior was inspired by John Soane. The library has a rectangular plan and is constructed in sandstone ashlar on a corner site at 57 Mosley Street. It has two storeys and a basement and roof space. Its facade on Mosley Street has a three-bay pedimented loggia with four Ionic columns set slightly forward and steps between the columns. Under the loggia are two entrance doors and three square windows at first floor level.

The Charlotte Street facade has an entrance into the loggia with a square window above and another on the first floor. A five-bay colonnade of Ionic semi-columns has tall sashed windows on the ground floor in each bay and square window above at first floor level. The attic storey is behind a pilastered parapet. Originally the reading room was on the ground floor and the library occupied the remainder of the ground floor and a mezzanine gallery. A glass-domed ceiling was inserted at gallery level in about 1920 to separate the new tenants from what remained of the library.

Prizes 
The Portico Library, in conjunction with its cultural partners and funders, hosts a series of literary prizes throughout the year to celebrate writers and poets from Northern England and beyond. The Portico Prize for Literature was established in 1985 and awarded biennially to a work of fiction or poetry and a work of non-fiction set wholly or mainly in the north of England. The library launched the Sadie Massey Award to celebrate the North West's young writers in 2015.

Notable members 
The library's first chairman was John Ferriar and its secretary was Peter Mark Roget. Other notable members include John Dalton, Reverend William Gaskell, Sir Robert Peel and more recently Eric Cantona.

Gallery

See also

Grade II* listed buildings in Greater Manchester
Listed buildings in Manchester-M2
List of works by Thomas Harrison

References

Library buildings completed in 1806
Grade II* listed buildings in Manchester
Libraries in Manchester
Thomas Harrison buildings
Greek Revival architecture in the United Kingdom